Pericalypta is a genus of flowering plants belonging to the family Acanthaceae.

Its native range is Madagascar.

Species:
 Pericalypta biflora Benoist

References

Acanthaceae
Acanthaceae genera